Olivier de Serres (1539–1619) was a French author and soil scientist whose Théâtre d'Agriculture (1600) was the accepted textbook of French agriculture in the 17th century.

Biography

Serres was born in 1539 at Villeneuve-de-Berg, Ardèche. His brother, Jean de Serres, was a well-known French humanist and translated the complete works of Plato.

His book was notable for recommending winegrowers to plant 5 to 6 varieties in their vineyards to balance the risk of a crop failing, an early advocacy of crop rotation.

It also recommended métayage (sharecropping) so that cash tenants would take all the risks and thus demand lower rent, as hired labour is expensive to manage. Sharecroppers administer themselves and risks are divided with the landlord. According to him, only large landowners should take the risk of hiring labourers and running the estate themselves.

See also

Sugar beet
Sarasson

Notes

External links

 Le Théâtre d'Agriculture, third edition, 1605 at Gallica

1539 births
1619 deaths
People from Villeneuve-de-Berg
Soil scientists
French agronomists
French gardeners
Writers from Auvergne-Rhône-Alpes
French male writers
French Protestants
17th-century agronomists
16th-century agronomists